"Goodnight Tonight" is a song by the British–American rock band Wings. Written and produced by Paul McCartney, it was released as a non-album single on 23 March 1979 by Parlophone in the UK and Columbia Records in the US. It was recorded during the sessions for the band's 1979 album Back to the Egg and is notable for its disco-inflected sound and spirited flamenco guitar break.

Recording
"Goodnight Tonight" began as an instrumental backing track McCartney had recorded in 1978. Needing a single for Wings to accompany the Back to the Egg album, McCartney took out the track and brought it into the studio, where the full Wings line-up completed it. Denny Laine and Laurence Juber added electric guitars, mirroring Paul's parts and Steve Holley added percussion, while the whole band sang in the chorus. Since the track was over seven minutes long, an edited version was used as the single, with the full version available as a 12-inch single. A music video was made for the song, showing Wings performing in 1930s costumes; stills from the video were used on the single's sleeve. In the US, the single was the first released under McCartney's new deal with Columbia Records.

Release
The track did not appear on Wings' then-current album Back to the Egg (from which sessions this song was recorded), as McCartney felt it did not fit the theme of the LP; it was later included on the McCartney compilations All the Best! (1987), Wingspan: Hits and History (2001) and Pure McCartney (2016). The 7" version was released as a bonus track on the 1993 remastered CD of McCartney II, as part of The Paul McCartney Collection.  The B-side of this single was "Daytime Nighttime Suffering".  An extended version of the song appears on a digital iTunes re-issue of Back to the Egg.

Charts and reception
"Goodnight Tonight" was an international hit, reaching number five on both the Billboard Hot 100 and the UK Singles Chart. John Lennon, McCartney's former songwriting partner, later commented that he did not care for the song, but enjoyed McCartney's bass guitar on the single. The single was certified Gold by the Recording Industry Association of America for sales of over one million copies.

Cash Box said it was an unusual song for McCartney in that the "percussion undercurrents and muscular bass playing is likely to receive disco play" and said that the "acoustic and electric guitars offer interesting flourishes." Record World called it "a semi-serious disco tune featuring every conceivable studio technique and a hook you can boogie (or sing) along with."

Track listings
7" single (R 6023)
 "Goodnight Tonight" – 4:15
 "Daytime Nighttime Suffering" – 3:19

12" single (12 YR 6023)
 "Goodnight Tonight" (Long Version) – 7:15
 "Daytime Nighttime Suffering" – 3:19

Personnel
 Paul McCartney – lead vocals, acoustic and electric lead guitars, bass, drums
 Linda McCartney – harmony and backing vocals, keyboards
 Denny Laine – backing vocals, lead guitar
 Laurence Juber – backing vocals, lead guitar
 Steve Holley – backing vocals, percussion

Chart performance

Weekly charts

Year-end charts

Certifications

References in popular culture
The song was featured in the 2010 film Grown Ups.

References

1978 songs
1979 singles
Disco songs
Columbia Records singles
Music published by MPL Music Publishing
Parlophone singles
Paul McCartney songs
Song recordings produced by Paul McCartney
Songs written by Paul McCartney
Paul McCartney and Wings songs
Songs about nights